A family tree is a chart representing family relationships in a conventional tree structure.

Family tree may also refer to:

Film and television 
 Family Tree (1999 film), an American film directed by Duane Clark
 Family Tree, a 2003 short film with music by Michael A. Levine
 Family Tree (2010 film), a French film directed by Olivier Ducastel and Jacques Martineau
 The Family Tree (film), a 2011 American film directed by Vivi Friedman
 The Family Tree (TV series), a 1983 American drama series
 Family Tree (TV series), a 2013 British-American mockumentary series

Literature 
 Family Tree (magazine), an American genealogy periodical
 Family Tree, a 1996 novel by Katherine Ayres
 The Family Tree, a 1997 novel by Sheri S. Tepper
 The Family Tree, a 2005 novel by Carole Cadwalladr
 Family Tree, a syndicated daily comic strip by Signe Wilkinson

Music 
 Family Tree Records, a South African record label
 Family Tree, a 1960s folk-rock group featuring Bob Segarini
 Family Tree, a grime music group featuring Merky ACE

Albums 
 Family Tree (Björk album), 2002
 Family Tree (Black Stone Cherry album) or the title song, 2018
 Family Tree (N.W.A album), 2008
 Family Tree (Nick Drake album), 2007
 Family Tree (Oh Land album) or the title song, 2019
 Family Tree (Oregon album) or the title song, 2012
 Family Tree, by Kylie Auldist, 2016

Songs 
 "Family Tree" (Darryl Worley song), 2002
 "Family Tree" (Kings of Leon song), 2014
 "Family Tree", by Belle & Sebastian Fold Your Hands Child, You Walk Like a Peasant, 2000
 "Family Tree", by Bone Thugs-n-Harmony from The Art of War, 1997
 "Family Tree", by Caylee Hammack from If It Wasn't for You, 2020
 "Family Tree", by Gerry Rafferty from Night Owl, 1979
 "Family Tree", by Jewel from Picking Up the Pieces, 2015
 "Family Tree", by Loretta Lynn from Van Lear Rose, 2004
 "Family Tree", by Megadeth from Youthanasia, 1994
 "Family Tree", by Ramz, 2018
 "Family Tree", by TV on the Radio from Dear Science, 2008
 "Family Tree" by Priscilla Renea from Coloured, 2018

Other uses 
 Family tree (horticulture), a tree grafted with multiple cultivars of a species
 Family Tree, a 2010 art installation by Tal Rosner